Moorefield is a community in Southwestern Ontario, located within the Wellington County township of Mapleton.

History
The founder of Moorefield, Richard C. Moore, was the son of a Baptist missionary who came to Canada for the purpose of establishing a church and converts in North America. Richard, as well as his brother George C. Moore, had involvement in various business ventures in the area. The family had moved to the new township of Maryborough in the 1850s and had established a church which the town was built around.

The earliest property deed listed for St. John's Anglican Church, Moorefield, is dated 23 July 1859 (Ledger A, begun in 1883), so it can be seen that the town grew with some rapidity, with a diversity of religion-since the founder of the town was strongly Baptist.

Notable people
 J. Lavell Smith - educator, administrator, and advocate of pacifism

References

Communities in Wellington County, Ontario